Marcin Awiżeń (born 1 November 1985) is a Paralympian athlete from Poland competing mainly in category T46 middle-distance events.

He competed in the 2008 Summer Paralympics in Beijing, China.  There he won a gold medal in the men's 800 metres - T46 event and finished fourth in the men's 1500 metres - T46 event.

External links
 

Paralympic athletes of Poland
Athletes (track and field) at the 2008 Summer Paralympics
Paralympic gold medalists for Poland
1985 births
Living people
People from Kozienice
Sportspeople from Masovian Voivodeship
Medalists at the 2008 Summer Paralympics
Paralympic medalists in athletics (track and field)
Polish male middle-distance runners
Paralympic middle-distance runners
21st-century Polish people